
Gmina Kowiesy is a rural gmina (administrative district) in Skierniewice County, Łódź Voivodeship, in central Poland.

The gmina contains part of the protected area called Bolimów Landscape Park.

Villages
Gmina Kowiesy contains the villages and settlements of Borszyce, Budy Chojnackie, Chełmce, Chojnata, Chojnatka, Chrzczonowice, Franciszków, Jakubów, Janów, Jeruzal, Kowiesy, Lisna, Michałowice, Nowy Lindów, Nowy Wylezin, Paplin, Paplinek, Pękoszew, Stary Wylezin, Turowa Wola, Ulaski, Wędrogów, Wola Pękoszewska, Wólka Jeruzalska, Wycinka Wolska, Wymysłów and Zawady.

Neighbouring gminas
Gmina Kowiesy is bordered by the gminas of Biała Rawska, Mszczonów, Nowy Kawęczyn and Puszcza Mariańska.

References
Polish official population figures 2006

Kowiesy
Skierniewice County